Modderfontein Stadium is a multi-use stadium situated in Modderfontein, which is a part of the Johannesburg Municipality, in the Gauteng province in South Africa. Currently, it is mostly used to host football matches.

Football related tenants
In recent years, until 2009, the stadium was used as headquarters and training ground by Platinum Stars F.C. Playing first in the National First Division and later in Premier Soccer League, the club however preferred to use some much bigger stadiums, as home venue for their professional league matches. In 2000-06 the club used the Peter Mokaba Stadium in Polokwane as home venue, and for subsequent years they have been playing at the Royal Bafokeng Stadium in Phokeng.
When Highlands Park FC won promotion for Vodacom League in June 2007, the club decided to move their training and home venue to the Modderfontein Sports Club. As of June 2011, this is still the home venue of the club.
2012, a new era of sports club is born in Modderfontein. New indoor football facilities will be built in 2012, as well as revitalising the new sports club in the hope of getting this heritage rich club back to where it belongs. Multi sports will be added to the existing 
Club which include squash, basketball, cricket, netball, outdoor football, plus the addition of sports bar, new restaurant facilities and conference centre.

Sports venues in Johannesburg
Soccer venues in South Africa